Goose Bay Airport may refer to:

 CFB Goose Bay, a Canadian Forces Base in Happy Valley-Goose Bay, Newfoundland and Labrador (IATA: YYR)
 Goose Bay Airport (Alaska), an airport in Goose Bay, Alaska, United States (FAA: Z40)